Muhammad Ayub Afridi is a Pakistani politician who had been a Member of the Senate of Pakistan from March 2018 to December 2021.

Political career
Afridi was elected to the Senate of Pakistan as a candidate of Pakistan Tehreek-e-Insaf on general seat from Khyber Pakhtunkhwa in 2018 Pakistani Senate election. He took oath as Senator on 12 March 2018.

On 23 November 2021, he resigned from his seat as senator and was appointed as Advisor to Prime Minister on Overseas Pakistanis.

References

Living people
Place of birth missing (living people)
Year of birth missing (living people)
Members of the Senate of Pakistan
Afridi family